Attack of the Killer Tomatoes is an American animated television series based on the 1978 film Attack of the Killer Tomatoes and its 1988 sequel Return of the Killer Tomatoes. The series aired on Fox Kids from 8 September 1990 to 23 November 1991. Repeats aired on Fox in 1992 and 1996, and on Fox Family from 1998 to 2000.

The show, a sequel to the original film, is about mad scientist Dr. Putrid T. Gangreen and his associate Igor Smith turning the tomatoes in the town of San Zucchini into monsters. The evil doctor was battled by young Chad Finletter, and his friends Tara Boumdeay (secretly a human/tomato hybrid pretending to be a teenage girl) and F.T., a "Fuzzy Tomato" pretending to be a dog.

Ownership of the series passed to Disney in 2001 when Disney acquired Fox Kids Worldwide, which also includes Marvel Productions, although as of 2022 the series is not available on Disney+.

Origin
The original film Attack of the Killer Tomatoes was released by Four Square Productions in 1978. A parody of the giant menace movies of the 1950s, it became a cult hit and predated the movie-spoofing disaster film Airplane! by two years.

The Killer Tomatoes might have remained in that genre had it not been for an unlikely intervention from an equally unlikely source. During the 1986–1987 season of Muppet Babies, there was a segment in the episode "The Weirdo Zone" upon which Baby Fozzie deals with how he once faced an 'Attack of the Silly Tomatoes'. The segment used clips from the movie and concluded with Baby Fozzie using a giant-sized ketchup bottle to capture the Silly Tomatoes (he told bad jokes and the large tomatoes launched themselves at him, only to be caught inside the bottle when he ducked out of the way). It became one of the higher-rated episodes of the season, so much that New World Pictures (the owner of Marvel Productions, which made Muppet Babies) approached Four Square about making a sequel to Attack of the Killer Tomatoes.

Four Square had never intended to make a sequel but when New World approached them with a two-million dollar budget towards filming a potential sequel, John De Bello, Costa Dillon and Stephen Peace got to work on crafting a script. The resulting film, Return of the Killer Tomatoes, was a surprise success.

New World was pleased with the results, and the company decided to duplicate the results of the film with an animated series aimed at a younger audience. Tweaking various characters and ideas from both Attack and Return, Attack of the Killer Tomatoes: The Series was born and debuted as one of the first Saturday morning cartoons on the Fox Children's Network in the fall of 1990.

There were many inside jokes to popular television series and movies that played out during the series' run.  It often poked fun at itself or its low-budget film origins.

Plot
The series picks up five years after The Great Tomato War (much as the film Return of the Killer Tomatoes did), where tomatoes are banned. However that has not stopped Dr. Putrid T. Gangreen from engaging in his experiments. Gangreen's ultimate goal is to rule the world and he will not let anyone stop him. But his most successful experiment may very well be his undoing. Tara Boumdeay, a tomato turned human, runs away from Gangreen, taking along her "Brother", the fur-covered F.T., whom she passes off as a dog. They befriend Chad Finletter (nephew of the Great Tomato War veteran, Wilbur Finletter) who, after saving the pair from a tomato attack, gets Tara a job at his uncle Wilbur's Tomatoless Pizza Parlor. She shares their secret with Chad regarding the two of them being tomatoes and Chad vows to help them against whatever Gangreen has planned. That is where everyone stands at the start of the first episode, "Give A Little Whistle", where the evil Doctor sets his new plans into motion (and would continue through the first season).

Season Two would center on Gangreen actually conquering the world in the debut episode. But Gangreen learns on a personal level the importance of the quote "Be careful what you wish for". He is overthrown by Zoltan and his gang of twice-mutated tomatoes and is forced to join up with Chad, Tara, Wilbur and the rest of the Killer Tomato Task Force (other vets of the Great Tomato War).

Characters

Main characters
 Chad Finletter (voiced by Christian Guzek) - The main protagonist of the story. Chad is a bright ten-year-old boy living with his Uncle Wilbur, working as a pizza delivery boy for Wilbur's Pizza Palace. Chad is one of the few people to know the truth about Tara and F.T. really being tomatoes, but as an act of friendship promised to keep their secret. Chad is the real guiding force behind stopping Gangreen, but because he is a kid, nobody takes him seriously. By the end of season one however, Gangreen puts a bounty on Chad to stop his constant interference. During the second season, Chad became a more of a leader by convincing the others to free Gangreen to help their cause. On one occasion Chad show annoyance at the KTTF incompetence saying "What I'm going to do with this collection of maroons?" Oddly enough, in the movie "Return of the Killer Tomatoes," Chad was an adult and Tara was a love interest.
 Tara Boumdeay (voiced by Kath Soucie) - One of Dr. Gangreen's failed experiments. She abandoned his evil plans with F.T. and escaped to the Finletter's where she is Chad's best friend and waitress at Wilbur Finletter's Pizza Palace. Tara is a beautiful teenage girl who has always liked Chad since he is always brave. She mostly wears a short red shirt, white shorts, and boots. Whenever salt is poured on her, Tara turns into a tomato. When pepper is poured on her, she sneezes and returns to her human form (usually given a tissue and blowing her nose afterward). She is also shown to have telepathic and telekinetic tomato powers. In the movie, she was actually Chad's girlfriend. While she shows a definite interest in him, in the cartoon they never do more than occasionally hug.
 Wilbur Finletter (voiced by Thom Bray) - A Great Tomato War veteran, leader of the Killer Tomato Taskforce and owner of Finletter's Pizza Palace. He is Chad's uncle and is very protective. He is frequently trying new recipes for his tomato-less pizzas, most of the time failing. He is still slightly delusional from the war and believes that the only good tomato is a squashed tomato. Although brave, he is not very smart as he and every adult believe F.T. is just an ugly dog. During the second season, Wilbur became more of a rebel leader when the killer tomatoes conquered the planet. He even put aside his grudges when breaking Dr. Gangreen out of jail to help the KTTF with their cause.
 F.T. (vocal effects provided by S. Scott Bullock) - Short for Fuzzy Tomato, F.T. was another failed experiment as he turned out cute, fuzzy, and completely unable to do anything destructive or evil. Right before Gangreen was going to destroy him, Tara rescued him and both ran off. Because of the tomato-hating world, F.T. masqueraded himself as "the world's ugliest dog". Chad is the only other person who knows what F.T really is, but promised to keep it a secret. Chad has found this easy so far as everybody besides those who know his secret believes he is a dog, and has not questioned its appearance. In a few episodes FT is referred to as Chad's dog as opposed to Tara's.
 Whitley White (voiced by Neil Ross) - The only reporter for San Zucchini news station. Like most of the other adults on the show, Whitley is an idiot. He has a habit of showing up in different parts of town to report on the events of the show or the aftermath (sometimes simultaneously carrying on conversations with himself from both the KRUD studios and 'Live at the Scene'). Whitley also has the distinction of being the last human not to be captured or defeated by the Killer Tomatoes in the second season (probably because his narrative helped keep the plots moving).

Recurring characters
 Tomato Guy (voiced by Maurice LaMarche) - A character who appeared in every episode of the show. He would shout "Tomato" only to cause anybody in the area to panic. This was presumably inspired by the character Costa Dillon played in the original Attack of the Killer Tomatoes film, who simply says "Tomato" in a library and scares all of the patrons so much that they run out of the classroom screaming in fear. As an additional sidenote, Tomato Guy is usually used as a speaking extra in various episodes when he is not shouting "Tomato" (this feat was also performed by Costa Dillon, who portrayed several roles such as a reporter, police guard, representative of the Screen Actors' Guild and more in "Return of the Killer Tomatoes"). It was later revealed in the Season Two episode "Stemming The Tide" that he makes fun of tomatoes because as a kid, he was served cold tomato soup at a family get-together (his cousin, who turned off the stove, bore a significant resemblance to a young Putrid T. Gangreen, though it was never made clear if the two of them were actually related). In any case, the soup was alive and pestering Tomato Guy until he captured it by covering his soup bowl with a saucer. He then cooked it on his relatives' stove. In Season One he is seen as a customer at Finletter's Pizza. Tara as a waitress is asking him to please make up his mind for a topping, after all, he could not kill anyone. The man responds "OK, do you have tomato?", which sends Tara into shock and reminds her of her horrible creation. She is revived by Uncle Wilbur who reassures her that the police have arrested him (presumably for violating the tomato prohibition laws) and that he will not be in the pizza parlor again for some time. His voice and design resembles that of Woody Allen.
 The Censor Lady (voiced by S. Scott Bullock) - An old woman (in a similar vein to 'The Church Lady' character played by Dana Carvey on Saturday Night Live) who appears and tries to stop a character if they are doing some violence-related or imitable behavior (such as suggesting that instead of the vampire tomatoes biting people's necks they kiss them in the episode "Spatula, Prinze of Dorkness" the end result was her being the first kissing victim-turned-vampire. She has also been seen arguing with Chad about his skateboard safety equipment, etc.) It was revealed in the episode 'Streets of Ketchup' she was something similar to Tara because she turned into a prune when squirted with salt water. In 'Camp Casserole', she attempted to silence the singing of '99 Bottles of Beer on the Wall' on a bus by saying "This is a kids' show, you can't say beer!" After the first season, she only appeared three times; the first time in the second season opener ("The Ripening Disaster") where she warned the audience about the violence that was overtaking the episode and threatened to end it early. Standing behind a red background, it soon becomes apparent that the red background is indeed Zoltan, who eats the Censor Lady and spits her back out (completely red from head to toe). She is then seen in the beginning of the second episode of season two briefly walking with the other world leaders who are all red from head to toe (apparently suffering the same fate as the Censor Lady). The final appearance was in "The Tomatoes Worms Turn" where she first made sure those in the African ride were buckled in as well as preventing the audience from hearing what Tomato Worms actually do to tomatoes.
 Sam "The Sham" Smith (voiced by S. Scott Bullock) - A member of the Killer Tomato Taskforce. Sam is a master of disguise, but yet his most recognizable outfit is that of the Lone Ranger.
 Floyd Bridgework (voiced by Thom Bray) - A member of the Killer Tomato Taskforce. Floyd is an underwater expert and is never seen without his scuba gear on, even when trying on a disguise or something like skating. He is often confused with his live-action counterpart underwater expert Greg Colburn due to the similarities the two have in design and concept.
 Mary Jo Nagamininashy (voiced by Kath Soucie) - A member of the Killer Tomato Taskforce. Mary Jo is the only female on the team besides Tara. She is a German athlete that is always into exercise, even when battling tomatoes. She is often confused with her live-action counterpart Russian Olympic athlete Gretta Attenbaum due to the similarities the two have in design and concept.
 Mayor Leonard Earwax (voiced by Cam Clarke) - The Mayor of San Zucchini. As his last name implies, he may very well be the stupidest character living in the San Diego-inspired city. He is an airhead who somehow lucked into his job. He made two significant appearances in the series, one where he slept through San Zucchini being overthrown (as shown in the first-season episode "Invasion of the Tomato Snatchers") and an appearance where he decides to name Wilbur Finletter as San Zucchini's first Sheriff since the 1920s (as shown in the episode "The Gang That Couldn't Squirt Straight"). An election poster could be seen of him as well in the episode "Give A Little Whistle".

Villains
 Dr. Putrid T. Gangreen (voiced by John Astin) - The main villain of the series. An "angry" scientist (as opposed to a "mad" one), Dr. Gangreen created the killer tomatoes with the goal of global domination. Along with his dull-witted assistant Igor Smith and army of tomatoes led by his head tomato Zoltan, he is always trying to destroy San Zucchini and conquer the world. Dr. Gangreen, on occasion would be breaking the fourth wall with antics such as firing 'bullets' from his Tomatocoptor, but then making the comment "Dang! If this were prime time (television), I could have used real bullets", suggesting that Dr. Gangreen realizes he is part of a children's cartoon show (other characters also realize it at times) and the network censors are clearly not going to permit him to commit violent acts. Although being a genius, he miscalculated two "failures" that became large obstacles in his plans. Fuzzy Tomato (or F.T. as he is called) and Tara, who abandoned him to live with humans. Viewers learned much about Dr. Gangreen in the first season, from the fact that he was the first man to domesticate the wild turnip and ate an entire lawnmower at the age of six (as revealed in the episode "Give A Little Whistle") to playing in a high school rock band named "Mothra and the Handpuppets" (as revealed in the episode "Streets of Ketchup"). In the episode "War of the Weirds" it was revealed that Gangreen's skin color and obsession with tomatoes came from his childhood rivalry with Sidney Igotcha, a rivalry that continued when Sidney became a scientist himself and used Killer Kumquats to try to take over San Zucchini. During the second season, Gangreen accomplished his goals of conquering Earth, only to be overthrown by Zoltan and imprisoned when it became apparent that conquering the world had an oddly calming effect on the scientist. He was busted out of jail by the Killer Tomato Taskforce and joined them in attempts to defeat Zoltan and the killer tomatoes once and for all. It was implied in "Stemming the Tide" that he was the cousin of Tomato Guy, though it was never revealed conclusively one way or the other. He is a homage to John Astin's Mortimer Gangreen in the movies.
 Igor Smith (voiced by Cam Clarke) - Igor Smith is an air-headed young man from Malibu who dreams of becoming a TV reporter. He is not really evil, but more of a man that fell into the wrong crowd. Still, he will do his master's work without question if it means that he will be rewarded for helping conquer the planet by being made a reporter. He takes any chance he gets to usurp Whitley White. During the second season, Igor was imprisoned with his master after being overthrown by Zoltan, only to be busted out by the Killer Tomato Taskforce, joining them in attempting to defeat the killer tomatoes once and for all.

Tomatoes
Besides Tara and F.T., the following characters are tomatoes that were created by Dr. Gangreen:

 Zoltan (voiced by Maurice LaMarche) - Dr. Gangreen's tomato commander. At first, Zoltan was a failed experiment originating from when Igor accidentally had placed old movies into their programming stage instead of training videos, causing him and his gang of five to be lazy and to imitate old movie characters occasionally (such as legendary actor James Cagney). Perhaps echoing what the future was to hold for Zoltan, he underwent a transformation into a vampire tomato dubbing himself "Spatula, Prince of Dorkness" (shown in the episode of the same name) and proceeded to kiss people on the neck to transform humans and tomatoes alike into vampires (a stipulation that the Censor Lady put into place in fear of showing the biting and bloodshed associated with vampires on a Saturday morning cartoon). Fortunately that was undone by Count Dracula himself, who, after handing Wilbur Finletter a cure for the vampirism, declared that the people of San Zucchini did not have the class to be vampires, nor did he want the bad press associated with the citizens' sole night of terror (despite the fact that Dracula himself had given Dr. Gangreen the vampire serum that changed Zoltan into a vampire early in the episode). During the second season, Zoltan and his gang were given a transformation, becoming larger, smarter, and deadlier. Zoltan and his gang conquered the planet and were each issued a continent to rule (e.g. Zoltan controls North America). Soon after that, Zoltan realized they did not need Gangreen anymore and overthrew him, allowing Zoltan to seize control of leader. The series was ended before a final episode resolving matters could be made, but it is assumed among fans that Zoltan and his tomatoes were eventually defeated in the end by the one thing Gangreen knew could destroy them, the African Tomato Worms.
 Tomacho (voiced by Cam Clarke) - One of Zoltan's gang of six. Tomacho rules over South America and is known as being very calm and chill but also dimwitted. Tomacho speaks like John Travolta and with a surfer accent. In the episode where the gang is temporarily turned into humans, Tomacho becomes a muscular, good-looking young man with long hair, true to his name.
 Beefsteak (voiced by Chuck McCann) - One of Zoltan's gang of six. Beefsteak rules over Europe, and is known for his short temper. Beefsteak has bull horns on his head and wears a nose ring, which only helps his image of charging at enemies like a bull.
 Fang (voiced by Susan Silo) - One of Zoltan's gang of six. Fang rules over Africa, and is known for her snake-like personality. Fang has serpent eyes, a snake's tongue and large fangs filled with venom. Fang had the biggest problem with her continent due to her soldiers not returning from the "Heart of Africa". Fang temporary took control of the Gang of Six in the last episode, but returned control over to Zoltan after her defeat by him.
 Ketchuck (voiced by Maurice LaMarche) - One of Zoltan's gang of six. Ketchunk rules over all of Asia and is known for being the biggest and fattest of the gang of six. Besides being large, Ketchunk is constantly drooling and always hungry for food.
 Mummato (voiced by Rob Paulsen) - One of Zoltan's gang of six. Mummato rules over Australia and New Zealand, and is known for his silence (though he does speak on rare occasions; his voice sounds much like Marlon Brando). Mummato is wrapped in bandages like a mummy.
 Phantomato (voiced by Maurice LaMarche) - A deformed tomato that sought refuge in the sewers after the tomatoes seized control of Earth. He hid his face behind a mask just like the Phantom of the Opera, and even had his own pipe organ. He saved Tara from Zoltan and Beefsteak and offered to help her find Gangreen once he was finished playing his organ. When the tomatoes located them and attempted to capture Tara again, he saved her by holding off the tomato soldiers while they escaped. Even though he only appeared in one episode and was one of the few good tomatoes, he received a figure in the toyline and was featured as a boss in the video game.
 The Ultimato - The last tomato experiment made by Dr. Gangreen who has the cloned brain of Dr. Gangreen. He was originally made to help the task force by fighting off the tomatoes, but later turned on them when he wanted to seize control for himself.
 Link (voiced by Maurice LaMarche) - A deformed tomato that was believed to be the missing link between normal, dormant tomatoes and the killer variety. First appearing in the episode "Tomato From The Black Lagoon", it is revealed that Link is not quite like his killer cousins. He aids Chad and Tara against Gangreen and Igor (Gangreen originally sought Link out to use him in a renewed effort to destroy San Zucchini). He is also very wealthy, as his lair is equipped with state-of-the-art technology and the finest foods. He appeared in a second-season episode, aiding Tara and Chad in their efforts to locate the African Tomato Worms. It is established in both this episode and the episode which the Phantomato debuted ("The Phantomato of the Opera") that the two of them are actually cousins.
 Johnny Tomato (voiced by Maurice LaMarche) - Inspired by his love of 1950s rockabilly music (and a desire to erase the mistakes he made when he first created Tara), Dr. Gangreen created a tomato that could change into a human named Johnny Tomato. Johnny (who looked almost exactly like a young 1950s-era Elvis Presley) was to be used to lure both The KTTF and Chad, Tara and FT to their doom. Johnny's conflicted emotions between loyalty to Gangreen (posing as Johnny's 'manager', Colonel Sam Green) and budding feelings towards Tara led to Johnny succumbing to the same allergy to salt that plagued Tara. It was then, with Gangreen's plot exposed, that Johnny (in a dormant tomato form) was swept away by Gangreen's army of Killer Tomatoes (all of this was shown in the first-season episode "Streets of Ketchup"). Though the character never appeared again, it was revealed in the second-season episode "The Phantomato of the Opera" that Johnny survived, as Wilbur Finletter (dressed in a 1970s-era Elvis jumpsuit) infiltrated an Elvis Presley Impersonator Contest in Memphis, Tennessee, searching for Dr. Gangreen (the whole episode concentrated on that plot point as other cast members searched other locations around the globe in their efforts to locate the angry scientist). Wilbur actually won himself a picture with Johnny Tomato due to his placing last in the competition.
 Tomato Minions - The Tomato Minions are all the other mutated tomatoes in the series. They act as soldiers to Professor Gangreen and Zoltan. In the 1st season they came in different colors which was yellow, green and orange but most of them are red of course. In the 2nd season they all were red and wore Roman-style war helmets and patrolled all parts of the world. They all looked the same as well.

Episodes

Series overview

Season 1 (1990)

Season 2 (1991)

Cast
 John Astin as Dr. Putrid T. Gangreen
 Thom Bray as Wilber Finletter, Floyd Bridgework
 S. Scott Bullock as F.T., Sam Smith, The Censor Lady, Count Dracula Various
 Cam Clarke as Igor Smith, Tomacho, Mayor Leonard Earwax
 Chris Guzek as Chad Finletter
 Maurice LaMarche as Zoltan, Ketchuck, Tomato Guy, Link, Phantomato, Johnny Tomato, Various
 Chuck McCann as Beefsteak
 Rob Paulsen as Mummato, Various
 Neil Ross as Whitley White
 Susan Silo as Fang
 Kath Soucie as Tara Boumdeay, Mary Jo Nagamininashy, Various

Crew
 Stu Rosen - Voice Director

Cancellation
Numerous changes from season one to season two factored in the cancellation of the series.  The show was now animated in a much different style than what viewers were used to (the second season is known for being the first Saturday Morning cartoon series to be computer animated), the single episode plots were done away with in favor of an ongoing storyline (partly due to the series changing story editors between seasons), no more than eight episodes were made for this second season (shown out of sequence in its initial run, no less) and changes to already-established characters contradicted facts and events that viewers witnessed in season one (such as Tara now being able to change into a tomato even if salt was not utilized at times, her being a tomato was now public knowledge, and she could move freely around and talk in her tomato form; none of these were true of Tara in season one).  The final change came in the form of taking the comedy-relief provided by Zoltan and the Gang of Five and doing away with that in favor of turning them into serious threats.

References

External links

 

1990 American television series debuts
1990s American animated television series
1990s American comic science fiction television series
1991 American television series endings
American children's animated comic science fiction television series
American children's animated science fantasy television series
Animated television shows based on films
Attack of the Killer Tomatoes
English-language television shows
Fox Broadcasting Company original programming
Fox Kids
Television series by Marvel Productions
Television series by Saban Entertainment